Jennifer Whalen may refer to:

Jennifer Whalen (actress), Canadian actor and comedian
Jennifer Whalen (cyclist), American racing cyclist

See also
Whalen, people with the last name Whalen